In mathematics, Tonelli's theorem may refer to

 Tonelli's theorem in measure theory, a successor of Fubini's theorem
 Tonelli's theorem in functional analysis, a fundamental result on the weak lower semicontinuity of nonlinear functionals on Lp spaces